Somabrachys is a genus of moths in the Somabrachyidae family.

Species
Somabrachys adherbal Oberthür, 1911
Somabrachys aegrota (Klug, 1830)
Somabrachys albinervis Oberthür, 1909
Somabrachys arcanaria (Milliére, 1884)
Somabrachys atrinervis Oberthür, 1911
Somabrachys capsitana Chrétien, 
Somabrachys chretieni Oberthür, 1908
Somabrachys codeti (Austaut, 1880)
Somabrachys dubar Powell, 1907
Somabrachys federzonii Krüger, 1934
Somabrachys fumosa Oberthür, 1911
Somabrachys guillaumei Oberthür, 1922
Somabrachys gulussa Powell, 1916
Somabrachys hiempsal Oberthür, 1911
Somabrachys holli Oberthür, 1911
Somabrachys infuscata (Klug, 1830)
Somabrachys khenchelae Oberthür, 1909
Somabrachys klugi Oberthür, 1909
Somabrachys kroumira Oberthür, 1911
Somabrachys manastabal Oberthür, 1911
Somabrachys maroccana Oberthür, 1911
Somabrachys massiva Oberthür, 1911
Somabrachys micripsa Powell, 1916
Somabrachys mogadorensis Oberthür, 1911
Somabrachys nisseni Powell, 1916
Somabrachys powelli Oberthür, 1908
Somabrachys ragmata Chrétien, 1910
Somabrachys robusta Hering, 1933
Somabrachys unicolor Oberthür, 1909
Somabrachys zion Hopp, 1922

Zygaenoidea
Zygaenoidea genera